The Nachtrieb-Kelly Ranch, also known as Maxwell Ranch, near Buena Vista, Colorado, was listed on the National Register of Historic Places in 2017.

It is a historic cattle and hay ranch with 24 identified resources, including three pioneer log buildings.

A  property on Maxwell Creek was homesteaded by Charles Nachtrieb in 1876. The ranch has held grazing rights to a large area of adjacent public lands. After two other owners, it was acquired by the Kelly family in 1951, and a portion was eventually sold off, and the Kelly family continued to operate it in 2017.

References

		
National Register of Historic Places in Chaffee County, Colorado
Ranches in Colorado